The 1972 Davis Cup was the 61st edition of the Davis Cup, the most important tournament between national teams in men's tennis. 55 teams would enter the competition, 33 in the Europe Zone, 11 in the Americas Zone, and 11 in the Eastern Zone. 

From this year's tournament onward, the Challenge Round was abolished, meaning the defending champion would now play in all matches rather than receiving a bye to the final, and the winner of the Inter-Zonal Zone would win the Davis Cup.

The United States defeated Chile in the Americas Inter-Zonal final, Australia defeated India in the Eastern Inter-Zonal final, and Romania and Spain were the winners of the two Europe Zones, defeating the Soviet Union and Czechoslovakia respectively.

In the Inter-Zonal Zone, the United States defeated Spain and Romania defeated Australia in the semifinals. The United States then defeated Romania in the final, giving the United States their fifth straight title. The final was played at the Club Sportiv Progresul in Bucharest, Romania on 13–15 October.

Americas Zone

North & Central America Zone

South America Zone

Americas Inter-Zonal Final
Chile vs. United States

Eastern Zone

Zone A

Zone B

Eastern Inter-Zonal Final
India vs. Australia

Europe Zone

Zone A

Zone A Final
Soviet Union vs. Romania

Zone B

Zone B Final
Spain vs. Czechoslovakia

Inter-Zonal Zone

Draw

Semifinals
Spain vs. United States

Romania vs. Australia

Final
Romania vs. United States

References

External links
Davis Cup Official Website

 
Davis Cups by year
Davis Cup
Davis Cup
Davis Cup
Davis Cup
Davis Cup